John Sambrooke (c.1692–1734) was a British merchant and politician who sat in the House of Commons from 1726 to 1734.

Sambrooke was the third son of Sir Jeremy Sambrooke, merchant, of Bush Hill, near Enfield, Middlesex, and his wife Judith Vanacker, daughter of Nicholas Vanacker merchant of Erith, Kent. He was admitted at St Catharine's College, Cambridge on 4 July 1709 and became a merchant trading with Turkey. He married Elizabeth Forester, daughter of Sir William Forester, MP of Dothill Park, Shropshire and his wife  Mary Cecil, daughter of James Cecil, 3rd Earl of Salisbury in May or June 1717.

Sambrooke was returned unopposed as Member of Parliament for Dunwich at a by-election on 4 April1726. At the  1727 general election, he was returned as a Whig MP for Wenlock on the interest of his brother-in-law, William Forester. All his known votes were against the Government, which  made it appear that he was a Tory, so  that in 1733 Lord Bradford, the leader of the Shropshire Whigs, openly opposed his re-election. The local Tories offered to support him anyway, but the arguments of Sambrooke that his behavior was not exceptional for a Whig, and the attempts of  Forester to persuade Bradford otherwise were unsuccessful. Sambrooke did not stand in 1734.

Sambrooke died without issue on 19 May1734, three weeks after the election. His brother Sir Samuel Sambrooke, 3rd Baronet was also an MP.

References

1690s births
1734 deaths
Members of the Parliament of Great Britain for English constituencies
British MPs 1722–1727
British MPs 1727–1734